Emlyn is an unincorporated community and census-designated place in Whitley County, Kentucky, United States. Its population was 427 as of the 2010 census. Emlyn has a post office with ZIP code 40730, which opened on May 29, 1902. U.S. Route 25W passes through the community.

Geography

Demographics

References

Unincorporated communities in Whitley County, Kentucky
Unincorporated communities in Kentucky
Census-designated places in Whitley County, Kentucky
Census-designated places in Kentucky